Tareq Abboushi is a Palestinian-American musician and composer who has spent time living and performing in both New York City and Ramallah.

His first instrument was the piano on which he practised western classical music before transitioning to jazz. He then studied for an B.M. in Jazz Piano from William Paterson University, during which time he also began playing the traditional Palestinian buzuq, a long-necked lute. His buzuq playing is influenced by his jazz sensibilities in its form of rhythms and phrasing.

Abboushi plays with many groups in the New York area and is the leader and composer of the Arabic/Jazz fusion quintet SHUSMO, which released its debut album One in 2005, and second album "Mumtastic" in 2011. He has also lectured on Arabic music at Columbia University, New York University, Juilliard School of Music, and the Museum of the City of New York.

References

External links
 Profile of Tareq Abboushi at the Institute for Middle East Understanding
 Biography at Shusmo Official Website
 Shusmo.com, the Official Website of the Quintet Shusmo
 Shusmo Page at Myspace.com

Living people
Palestinian musicians
William Paterson University alumni
Columbia University faculty
New York University faculty
Year of birth missing (living people)